Nuclear pore glycoprotein-210 (gp210) is an essential trafficking regulator in the eukaryotic nuclear pore complex. Gp-210 anchors the pore complex to the nuclear membrane. and protein tagging reveals its primarily located on the luminal side of double layer membrane at the pore. 
A single polypeptide motif of gp210 is responsible for sorting to nuclear membrane, and indicate the carboxyl tail of the protein is oriented toward the cytoplasmic side of the membrane.

Disassembly and Assembly
During eukaryotic mitosis the nuclear envelope disintegrates into vesicles dispersing nuclear lamina proteins and nuclear pore complexes. Nup210 is specifically phosphorylated on the C-terminal (cytoplasmic) domain in mitosis at Ser1880 and is dispersed throughout the endoplasmic reticulum during mitosis as homodimers. Nuclear lamins begin to reassemble around chromosomes at the end of mitosis. Nup210 lags the reassembly process relative to other Nups. and while much of the assembly process can occur without it, the final assembly and dilation of the complexes require Nup210. The replacement of serine at position 1880 with a phosphorylated 'looking' glutamate results in Nup210 complexes that fail to reassemble indicating that dephosphorylation of Nup210 within the final phases of proper assembly is required.

Pathology
Recognized by anti-nuclear antibodies found in primary biliary cirrhosis (PBC) anti-Nup210 antibodies correlate with progression toward end stage liver disease. Nup210 is possibly a destructive autoimmune target of the disease. One idea for the loss of tolerance is the increased or abnormal expression of Nup210 in patients with PBC.

Anti-mitochondrial, anti-centromere  and anti-nup62 are also found in PBC.

References

Autoantigens
Glycoproteins
Membrane proteins
Nuclear pore complex